Camassia howellii, commonly known as Howell's camas, is a species of perennials endemic to western Oregon.

Discovered in 1889, Camassia howellii is now considered to be imperiled due to residential development, mining and grazing.

Distribution

 Camassia howellii is found exclusively in the southwestern region of Oregon. The 12 populations make up a total of 3000 plants. These sites are threatened by human developments. This species is currently under the global conservation status rank G2 Imperiled. Although other species of Camassia are still abundant in the Northwest, this one is not in Oregon.

Camassia howellii thrives in wet meadows in serpentine soil. They are found in eastern Oregon where precipitation levels range from 70 to 100 inches per year and temperatures from 40 to 80 degrees Fahrenheit per year. These perennials are late bloomers usually during the month of May and the flowers will wither in the autumn.

Description

Camassia howellii grows from a bulb and has 60 cm long basal leaves which range around 4 to 7 per plant.

There can be 100 flowers in a raceme. The flowers are radially symmetrical and are composed of five deep bluish violet petals. The petals range from 10 to 20 mm long and about 3 to 5 mm wide. This species is known to bloom in the month of May.

Uses
Native Americans and settlers considered Camassia howellii as an important part of their diet. The city of Camas in Washington and many parts of the Northwestern United States was named after this plant due to its large cultivation and consumption by the Native Americans and first white settlers.

In autumn the bulbs were harvested after the flowers dried up and were boiled or pit-cooked. The bulbs were also dried and ground into flour. As the settlers began to expand their territory, they raised cattle which limited the growth of camas in the area.

References

External links
photo of herbarium specimen at Missouri Botanical Garden, collected in Oregon in 1889

Agavoideae
Flora of Oregon
Endemic flora of the United States
Endangered flora of the United States
Plants described in 1890
Endemic flora of Oregon